Total Logistic Control is a supply chain company started around 1902 by George K. Taylor. 
The company began as a regional distributor of frozen products known as Taylor Cold Storage. They operated frozen warehouse operations for other regional food companies in Great Lakes region. Around 1930, they merged with Wisconsin Cold Storage. In 1958, Taylor became the first public refrigerated warehouse to offer consolidated LTL distribution to its customers. In the 1960s, their total freezer capacity hit . Taylor introduced TINMAN, the Total INformation MANagement system, in 1976, becoming the first firm in the industry to offer on-line inventory management.

In 1982, a flood wiped out the company warehouses, creating the opportunity to refocus the company on third-party logistics as Total Logistic Control.  They achieved Foreign Trade Zone status in 1990.

Acquired by 'Christiana Companies, Inc' in 1994, the company went into a growth phase. Merging with Wiscold in 1996, starting a Logistics Management Services division in 1999, and then acquiring the ProSource Group in 2000 (offering turnkey facility design).  In 2002, they purchased two over-the-road trucking companies of TSI and Birkmire Trucking; taking their fleet total to around 400 tractor-trailers.

They were acquired by SuperValu in 2005 and moved their corporate offices to Holland, MI in 2008. Today, TLC is a Source-to-Shelf supply chain company targeting the consumer goods supply chain. 97% of the products they touch end up in retail. Last year that was over 2 billion cases (CEs).

Distribution companies of the United States
Companies based in Michigan
Holland, Michigan
SuperValu (United States)
2005 mergers and acquisitions